Axur, re d'Ormus ("Axur, king of Ormus") is an operatic dramma tragicomico in five acts by Antonio Salieri. The libretto was by Lorenzo Da Ponte. Axur is the Italian version of Salieri's 1787 French-language work Tarare which had a libretto by Beaumarchais.

Synopsis
Axur, King of the Persian Gulf kingdom of Ormus, orders one of his soldiers, Altamor, to abduct Aspasia, the wife of Atar, the heroic commander of Axur's army. Not knowing who kidnapped Aspasia but suspecting an overseas enemy, Atar speaks with the king and begs for justice. Moved by his appeal, Axur allows Atar to take a ship and seek his wife. Before Atar leaves, Axur's slave-servant, Biscroma, tells the general that the king has abducted Aspasia and hidden her in the royal harem. Enemy troops now threaten to invade Ormus, and the people plead with Atar to save them. Axur undermines Atar by telling the people that the general has better things to do than lead the army. Enraged, Atar declares himself ready to stand at the head of the army and wipe out the nation's enemies.

While a feast is being held prior to the battle, Biscroma disguises Atar as a Nubian and smuggles him into the harem. Axur discovers "the Nubian" in the harem, but does not realize who he is. Axur decides to marry Aspasia to the Nubian as punishment for being unfaithful to Atar. Axur then changes his mind, and instead sends a squad of soldiers into the harem to kill "the Nubian". The soldiers discover "the Nubian's" true identity. They decide not to kill Atar, because they only have orders to kill "the Nubian" and not the general of the army. But they have orders to arrest Atar, so they do so and bring him before the king. Atar is dragged into court as Axur is wooing Aspasia. The husband and wife embrace. Axur sentences Atar to death for violating the royal harem, and Atar is dragged off to the place of execution. But a crowd surrounds the palace and demands Atar's freedom so that he can save the nation. Axur, realizing he has lost the love of the people, removes his crown and commits suicide. The people proclaim Atar the new King of Ormus.

Performance history
Axur premiered at the Burgtheater in Vienna on 8 January 1788, the title role being sung by Francesco Benucci, Mozart's first Figaro. It became one of the most famous operas in Vienna, being performed much more frequently than Mozart's Don Giovanni, which was first performed in Vienna on 7 May 1788.

The finale of Axur appears in the 1984 film Amadeus. The film is incorrect in presenting Axur as being performed soon after the ninth and final performance of Mozart's Marriage of Figaro in 1786, and before the death of Mozart's father Leopold Mozart on 28 May 1787. Also, the end of the aria "Son Queste Le Speranze" appears briefly at the beginning of the film, Salieri remembering Caterina Cavalieri singing this, as he demonstrates various pieces he wrote to the priest.

Roles

Recordings
The overture has been recorded by the Slovak Radio Symphony Orchestra (Bratislava) conducted by Michael Dittrich, on Naxos Records. The Finale can be found on the More Amadeus soundtrack, conducted by Sir Neville Marriner. 

The whole opera was recorded by René Clemencic in 1989 in Siena with the Russian Philharmonic Orchestra and Coro "Guido d'Arezzo", with Andreas Martin in the title role, and other leading roles taken by Eva Mei (Aspasia), Curtis Rayam (Atar) and Ettore Nova (Biscroma/Brighella). The recording was issued by Nuova Era in 2001 (NE 7366 & 67) and reissued in 2005.

References

External links

Operas
Italian-language operas
Operas by Antonio Salieri
1788 operas
Opera world premieres at the Burgtheater
Operas set in ancient Persia